The Astravets Nuclear Power Plant (also called the Belarusian Nuclear Power Plant or Ostrovets Nuclear Power Plant) is a nuclear power plant located in the Astravyets District, Grodno Region in north-western Belarus. The plant is powered by a 1194-MW VVER-1200 unit supplied by Atomstroyexport, the nuclear equipment exporter branch of the Russian nuclear corporation Rosatom. Another 1194-MW VVER-1200 unit is under construction. The plant is owned by State Enterprise Belarusian NPP, which in turn is owned by the state-owned operator Belenergo.

Initial plans of the plant were announced in the 1980s, but were suspended after the 1986 Chernobyl disaster. The project was revived by the Belarusian government to have the country become energy-independent due to the Russia-Belarus energy dispute in 2007. The power plant was controversial due to its location being close proximity with Lithuania and the Lithuanian government has boycotted the power plant and established anti-radiation safety measures with its citizens. Construction of the first unit started on 8 November 2013 and the second on 27 April 2014. The plant entered commercial operation with Atomstroyexport transferring the first unit to Belenergo on 10 June 2021, becoming the first VVER-1200 unit to operate outside Russia.

History

Planning 
Following the Chernobyl nuclear disaster, these plans were halted. 
The plant was to comprise two VVER-1000 nuclear reactors, designed to provide both electricity and heat for the city of Minsk. The reactors would each have had a power rating of 900 MW net and 940 MW gross capacity.

The nuclear initiative was revitalized after Belarus gained independence from the Soviet Union. On 22 December 1992, Belarus announced its intention to build nuclear power plants and started a program to examine 15 possible sites. It was foreseen that the first unit of 500-600 MW would be commissioned by 2005, and additional units with a combined capacity of 1,000 MW by 2005 and 2010. However, no decision concerning site or reactor type was made. In 1999, the Government of Belarus adopted a nuclear moratorium, but preparations for the construction of a nuclear power plant were carried on.

On 2 May 2002, Belarusian President Alexander Lukashenko stated that Belarus would not construct a nuclear power plant on its territory, but was interested in purchasing nuclear power from Russia, and in the possibility of constructing a Belarus-owned reactor at the Smolensk nuclear power plant in Russia. 
However, in mid 2006, the Government of Belarus approved a plan for the construction of an initial 2000 MWe nuclear power plant in the Mahilyow Voblast using pressurized water reactors technology.

After the Russia-Belarus energy dispute in 2007, Lukashenko re-declared that to ensure national energy security, Belarus needed to build its own nuclear power plant. In June 2007, Russia offered a US$2 billion credit line for the purchasing of equipment from Russia's Power Machines Company.

On 12 November 2007, a decree defining the organizations responsible for preparing the construction of the nuclear power plant was signed. The Belarusian Security Council made the decision to construct a nuclear power plant on 15 January 2008. 
The Nuclear Power Act, covering the design and construction of nuclear facilities, the security, safety, and physical protection of such facilities, and their regulation (and also prohibiting the production of nuclear weapons and other nuclear explosives), was adopted by the House of Representatives of the National Assembly of Belarus on 25 June 2008.

Alternative sites were Chyrvo, Bykhaw , and Kukshynava between Horki and Shkloŭ in Mahilyow Voblast.

In January 2009, it was decided that the nuclear power plant will be built by Atomstroyexport, the nuclear equipment exporter branch of the Russian nuclear corporation Rosatom and the Russian loan was agreed in February 2009.  The contract was signed in 2011.

Construction 

Both in March and April 2013 journalists were not permitted to visit the construction site. In March 2013 Radio Svaboda's correspondent Mikhail Karnevich received official permission to make a report about the construction of the power plant. But when he came to Astravets, he found out that he would not be able to visit the construction site. 
In April 2013 journalists Ales Barazenka and Nastaśsia Jaūmien were detained in Astravets where they were filming the nuclear power plant construction and were asked an "intelligible explanation to the fact of filming the construction works".

The first nuclear concrete for Unit 1 was poured on 6 November 2013.
The construction of the second unit began 8 months later. Construction of each unit was expected to take about five years.

In November 2015, Lithuania informed that there is no possibility to reserve power of the Kruonis Pumped Storage Plant, aside from emergency case, for the Belarusian nuclear power plant.

In February 2016, the 330-tonne, 13-meter high, 4.5 meters diameter, reactor vessel (which was the first reactor produced by Atommash after a 29-year hiatus) was delivered to the site. According to press reports, it took Atommash 840 days (2 years and 4 months) to build the reactor; it was shipped from the plant on 14 October 2015. After being transported by barge over the Tsimlyansk Reservoir, the Volga-Don Canal, the Volga–Baltic Waterway, and the Volkhov River to Novgorod, the reactor was then shipped by a special rail car to the Astravyets railway station near the plant.

On 10 July 2016, the reactor vessel for Unit 1 was accidentally dropped from a height of 4 meters while being moved around the construction site. Rosatom eventually agreed to swap the vessel with one intended for the Kaliningrad Nuclear Power Plant.

Commissioning
In December 2019, the first unit started hot trials, checking the reactor unit under hot conditions, but with dummy fuel rods placed in the reactor. These tests were completed in April 2020. In February 2020, the plant was inspected by IAEA. Fuel loading for the first unit started on 7 August 2020. On 11 October 2020, Unit 1 achieved first criticality. The reactor started supplying electricity on 3 November 2020 and was officially connected to the grid on 7 November 2020.  Testing in January 2021 resulted in disconnection from the grid. Astravets NPP was issued an operating license on 2 June and entered commercial operation 8 days later.

Criticality of unit 2 was first announced on 26 April 2022.

Technical description
The nuclear power plant costs up to US$11 billion. In addition, there are investments to upgrade the national power grid for power transmission from the nuclear power plant, and the construction of an urban settlement for the power plant's workers. Repayment of the $10 billion loan would start no later than April 2021. Half the loan was at a fixed 5.23% interest rate and the other half at the six-month Libor dollar rate plus 1.83%. In 2020 Belarus requested an extension of the repayment period from 25 to 35 years.

The preparation, design and exploration works were overseen by a Directorate for the Construction of a Nuclear Power Plant, established under the Ministry of Energy. The Nuclear and Radiation Safety Department, part of the Emergencies Ministry, is acting as the state nuclear regulator and licensing authority. Scientific support for the project is provided by the United Power & Nuclear Research Institute Sosny of the National Academy of Sciences of Belarus. The state-owned power engineering industry research and design institute Belnipienergoprom was the general designer of the plant and operates as the project management company, negotiating and signing contracts with suppliers, carrying out feasibility studies and preparing tender documents. Yelena Mironova is the Head of the project management service.

Atomstroyexport was the contractor and supplier of the III generation VVER-1200 type reactors (AES-2006 model). The first two reactors have the combined capacity of around 2400 MW. It is possible that two additional reactors will be built by 2025.

Opposition
The nuclear power plant plans have raised several concerns. Civil society groups have in 2008 campaigned and collected signatures against the construction of a nuclear power plant in Belarus. 

In 2008 young members of the Belarusian People's Front have campaigned against possible Russian involvement in the construction of the plant and urged the Belarusian government to award the contract to build the nuclear power plant to a company based in a country other than Russia. 

Also in 2008 a group of Belarusian scientists founded a movement for a nuclear-free Belarus, claiming that the Belarusian government started preparations for the construction of the nuclear power plant before a moratorium adopted in 1999 was expired. The moratorium expired on 14 January 2009.

On 1 July 2009, a Ukrainian NGO sent a complaint to the Implementation Committee of the Espoo Convention alleging numerous violations of the Espoo Convention. In particular, the complaint argues that Belarus is in violation of the requirements of the convention by pre-defining two key alternatives of the nuclear power plant construction – location and no-action alternative, as well as by not establishing an environmental impact assessment procedure that permits public participation. 

In December 2009 European ECO Forum Legal Focal Points submitted a complaint to the Compliance Committee of the Aarhus Convention challenging the legality of NPP construction due to violation of public participation rights provided by the Aarhus Convention.

Lithuania is a critic of the power plant and in 2018 announced its plan to boycott it.

On 7 February 2019, the Meeting of the Parties to the Espoo Convention decided that Belarus had violated the convention in choosing a construction site for its nuclear power plant.

Incidents
On 10 November 2020 the facility's output was suspended after several voltage transformers exploded. Repairs were completed within nine days and the plant was consequently reconnected to the grid.

See also

 List of nuclear reactors

References

Nuclear power stations in Belarus
Nuclear power stations with reactors under construction
Nuclear power stations using VVER reactors